Nick Greenhalgh (born 8 November 1989) is a former professional Rugby player, he last played for Northampton Saints in the Guinness Premiership. His preferred position is outside centre.

His first game was against Bristol Rugby in the EDF Energy Trophy when he came on as substitute for the final 2 minutes.

12 sometimes 13...

References

External links
Northampton Profile

1989 births
Living people
English rugby union players
Northampton Saints players
Rugby union players from Northampton
Rugby union fullbacks